The Ajellomycetaceae are a family of fungi in the Ascomycota, class Eurotiomycetes. The family contains eight genera.

References

Onygenales
Ascomycota families
Taxa described in 2004